The Moama Football Netball Club, nicknamed the Magpies, is an Australian rules football and netball club based in the town of Moama located in the Riverina district of New South Wales. The club teams currently compete in the Murray FNL, which Moama joined in 1997.

The Moama Football Club has teams in leagues that range from Under 12s to Seniors. Their Under 14s team gained local publicity for winning four premierships back-to-back from 2012 to 2015.
Under the coaching of Under 17s coach Adrian Daly, the under 17s have also won 4 premierships in a row spanning from 2013 to 2017 also several players have gone on to play for representative teams such as the New South Wales Rams and the Victoria Country squad.

Premierships

Ground

References

External links
 Facebook page
 SportsTG site

Murray Football League clubs
Echuca-Moama
Australian rules football clubs in New South Wales
Netball teams in New South Wales